The Nosebleeds are a punk band formed in Wythenshawe, Manchester, England in 1976. The band is well known in modern rock history for the later successes of its individual members, notably Morrissey (the Smiths), Billy Duffy (the Cult), and Vini Reilly (the Durutti Column). During their early days, they were known as Ed Banger and the Nosebleeds, until the departure of singer Ed Banger (Ed Garrity).

Biography

Ed Banger and The Nosebleeds
Eddie Garrity, lead singer of the band - originally called Wild Ram - worked as a roadie for fellow Wythenshawe band Slaughter & The Dogs at their gig supporting the Sex Pistols along with Buzzcocks at Manchester's Lesser Free Trade Hall on 20 July 1976. The Sex Pistols were returning to the Hall after a 4 June concert that served as a catalyst for Manchester's fledgling music scene.

When the crowd at the gig became violent and Garrity and a friend were injured, someone said, "You're a right bloody mob aren't you? Headbanger here and him with a nosebleed", inspiring Wild Ram's transformation into Ed Banger and the Nosebleeds.

Vini Reilly, later of The Durutti Column played guitar, Garrity (Ed Banger) sang, Tomanov (Toby) played drums and Peter Crookes played bass.

The newly-christened group changed their image and sound to align themselves with the punk movement and released the single "I Ain't Been to No Music School" / "Fascist Pigs" on Rabid Records. It sold 10,000 copies but failed to launch the band to success (possibly due to management issues). The group appeared on the television program Granada Reports to perform the single.

The band began to argue over money and shortly thereafter, Garrity and Reilly left the band.

The Nosebleeds (mark II)
Manchester music fan Steven Morrissey, later of the Smiths, replaced Garrity. Billy Duffy, later of Theatre of Hate and the Cult, replaced Reilly.

The new lineup played only two gigs, one of which was well reviewed in the New Musical Express. "The Nosebleeds re-surface boasting a Front Man With Charisma, always an advantage", wrote reviewer Paul Morley. "Lead singer is now minor local legend Steve Morrison, who, in his own way, is at least aware that rock 'n' roll is about magic, and inspiration."

The Nosebleeds split up in 1978.

Ed Banger, Therapy Group
After the Nosebleeds folded, Eddie Garrity supported Penetration and the Fall as Ed Banger and His Group Therapy. Garrity released three more singles under the "Ed Banger" moniker: 1978's "Kinnel Tommy" (on Rabid Records, which was rereleased later that year by EMI), 1981's "I've Just Had Me Car Nicked" (on Spiv Records), and 1983's "Poor People" (on Cloud Nine Records). In 1979 he also released a single under the name Eddi Fiction.

In 1979-80 he joined Slaughter & the Dogs for the Bite Back album and singles "I'm the One" and "East Side of Town".

In 1991, under the name "Sound of the Baskerville", Eddie Garrity released a compilation of Nosebleeds, Slaughter & the Dogs and Ed Banger tracks together with new material.

In 2005, the vintage 1977 documentary The Rise And Fall Of The Nosebleeds – Punk Rediscovered, directed and edited by Bob Jones and John Crumpton, premiered in Salford.

As of 2006, Eddie Garrity was fronting a 70s glam band called Edwina's Rockschool.

In 2008, under the name Edwina's Party, two albums were released, Transistor Pop and Transistor Rock.

In 2010, Ed Banger released a new lo-fi album, Bingo Town.

In 2013 Ed Banger & the Nosebleeds were reformed by Ed featuring former Slaughter & the Dogs drummer Brian "Mad Muffet" Grantham. The current lineup also has Steve Wilson on bass and Al Crosby on lead guitar. An album called Kicking Off was released in late 2013, followed by New York City in 2016. The band are currently gigging, and recording has started on new songs with a view to another album in late 2016-early 2017.

Phillip "Toby" Tomanov was last spotted gigging in Weymouth with various bands including the Inhalers and Panic Attack.

Discography

Single
"Ain't Bin To No Music School" / "Fascist Pigs"
Label: Rabid Records
Catalog #: TOSH 102
Format: 7"
Country: Winston-Salem
Released: July 1977

Albums
Kicking Off
Label: EBN
Catalog #: 
Format: CD 
Released 2013

New York City
Label: EBN
Catalog #: EBN002
Format: CD
Released: April 2016

Compilation appearances
Streets, includes "Ain't Bin to No Music School"
Label: Beggar's Banquet Records
Catalog # BEGA1
Format: Vinyl LP
Country: UK
Released: 1977

References

External links

English punk rock groups
Musical groups from Manchester
People from Wythenshawe
Musical groups established in 1976
1976 establishments in England